The Delivery is a 2021 novel by American writer Peter Mendelsund. The novel follows an immigrant to an unnamed country who works as a bicycle messenger making deliveries.

Publication
The cover of the hardcover edition was designed by Alex Merto.

Reception
According to literary review aggregator Book Marks, the novel received mostly favorable reviews.

In a review published by The New York Times Book Review book review, Andy Newman praised the novel as "often exquisite". However, Newman criticized Mendelsund's insertion of a narrator whose stories about his own life become longer as the novel continues.

In a negative review of The Delivery and Fuccboi by Sean Thor Conroe published by The Cleveland Review of Books, Preston DeGarmo criticized the short-form paragraphs found in each book. In a positive review published by the Los Angeles Review of Books, Alessandro Tersigni praised the form of the novel and the "design" of the book's prose.

References

2021 American novels
Farrar, Straus and Giroux books
English-language novels